Polle is a municipality in the district of Holzminden, in Lower Saxony, Germany. It is situated on the river Weser, approx. 8 km northwest of Holzminden.

References

Holzminden (district)